{{DISPLAYTITLE:C30H62}}
The molecular formula C30H62 (molar mass: 422.81 g/mol, exact mass: 422.4852 u) may refer to:

 Squalane, branched alkane
 Triacontane, linear alkane